Domingo Pantaleón Tristan y Moscoso was a Peruvian general and politician.

Biography
Tristán was born in Arequipa on July 27, 1768. His parents were José Joaquín Tristán del Pozo y Carassa and María Mercedes Moscoso Pérez Oblitas, members of the Arequipa Creole high society. Among his brothers were Pío de Tristán, last viceroy of Peru. He studied in the city of Cuzco, he was later sent by his parents to Spain where he served for a time as a Midshipman in the Royal Navy, in 1791 he returned to Peru after being appointed colonel of the Majes Valley militias.

In 1809 he was part of the army under the command of his cousin, General José Manuel de Goyeneche, against the Juntistas of Upper Peru. He repressed the Yungay uprising, defeating in Irupana the caudillo Manuel Victorio García Lanza who, together with Gabriel Antonio Castro, went in pursuit until the Indians under his charge managed to capture them and cut off their heads, which were exhibited by Tristán on November 1809 in the town of Chulumani. However, when the Auxiliary Army troops advanced towards Potosí, on November 16, 1810, then-Governor Tristán signed the act of adhesion to the government of Buenos Aires and three days later issued a patriotic proclamation. After the defeat of the Auxiliary and Combined Army in Huaqui and the pardon decreed by General Goyeneche, he was confirmed in his position, later returning to lower Peru free of guilt, although under suspicion, being definitively separated from the royal army. In 1813 he was elected deputy to the Cortes for Arequipa, this fact being harshly criticized by Viceroy José Fernando de Abascal who considered that behind his election was the vote of the seditious, the audacious and the schemers. On his way to Spain in Jamaica, he received the news of the dissolution of the courts, so he returned to Peru.

In 1821 he left the south and went to Lima, after the landing of the liberating expedition of San Martín, to present himself to the ranks of the patriot army, being that despite his lack of military qualities, San Martín entrusted him with the command of an important division of his army that in 1822 was completely destroyed in Ica by the Spanish general José de Canterac. In 1827 he was appointed prefect of Ayacucho and commanded the repression of the royalist rebels from Iquicha who had risen up against the republican authorities. In 1834 he took the side of President Luis José de Orbegoso against the rebellion of Generals Agustín Gamarra and Pedro Pablo Bermúdez. Retired from active service, he died in Arequipa in 1847.

See also
 Tristán family:
Pío de Tristán
Flora Tristán
Victoria Tristán, wife of President of Peru José Rufino Echenique

References

 1768 births
 1847 deaths
 Peruvian people of Spanish descent
People from Arequipa